Northwestfest is an annual film festival in Edmonton, Alberta, which programs a lineup of documentary films. Organized by Global Visions Festival Society, the event is staged annually at the Garneau Theatre. This film festival is the longest running documentary film festival in Canada.

Originally launched in 1983 by the Edmonton Learners Centre, the event was known as the Third World Film Festival and concentrated primarily on documentary films about international development. It was rebranded as the Global Visions Film Festival in 1998, expanding its focus to program a wider selection of documentary films, and then adopted its current name in 2015.

The event is a qualifying festival for the Canadian Screen Awards.

References

External links

Documentary film festivals in Canada
Film festivals in Edmonton
Film festivals established in 1983
1983 establishments in Alberta